Carhuachuco (possibly from Quechua qarwa yellowish, chuku hat) is a mountain in the Pariacaca mountain range in the Andes of Peru, about  high. It is situated in the Junín Region, Yauli Province, in the districts Suitucancha and Yauli. Carhuachuco lies south of the mountain Putka and south-west of the lake Putkaqucha.

References

Mountains of Peru
Mountains of Junín Region